Villa Martelli town in the Partido of Vicente Lopez, in the Greater Buenos Aires metro area.

History
The first recorded settlement in the area occurred on May 6, 1910, and the town was officially recognized by the Provincial Legislature on July 27, 1964. The Villa Martelli Army Barracks were the site of a military mutiny in 1988 by a right-wing Carapintadas faction led by Col. Mohamed Alí Seineldín. The barracks were later closed, and in 2011, a portion of the extensive lot became the site of the Tecnópolis exposition fairground.

External links
Ward of Villa Martelli
Searching Villa Martelli

References

Vicente López Partido
Populated places in Buenos Aires Province
Populated places established in 1964
Cities in Argentina
Argentina